Sanctuary (Spanish:Sagrario) is a 1933 Mexican drama film directed by Ramón Peón and starring Ramón Pereda, Adriana Lamar and Julio Villarreal.

Cast
  Ramón Pereda as Dr. Horacio Rueda  
 Adriana Lamar as Elena Rivero  
 Julio Villarreal as Juan Rivero  
 María Luisa Zea as Sagrario Rivero  
 Luis G. Barreiro as Dr. Gutiérrez  
 Juan Orol as Carmelo  
 Consuelo Moreno as Concha  
 Pili Castellanos as Sagrario, niña  
 María Valdealde as Doña Lupe  
 Jesús Melgarejo as Don Chencho  
 María Luisa Armit as Criada  
 Francisco Lugo as Arturo  
 Fabián Villar as Detective 
 Carlos L. Cabello as Preso

References

Bibliography 
 Daniel Balderston, Mike Gonzalez & Ana M. Lopez. Encyclopedia of Contemporary Latin American and Caribbean Cultures. Routledge, 2002.

External links 
 

1933 films
1933 drama films
Mexican drama films
1930s Spanish-language films
Films directed by Ramón Peón

Mexican black-and-white films
1930s Mexican films